The dead mother complex is a clinical condition described by Andre Green involving an early and destructive identification with the figure of a 'dead' – or rather depressed and emotionally unavailable – mother.

Complex/syndrome
Green introduced the concept in an essay written in 1980, published in 1983, and translated into English in 1986. He saw the dead mother complex as involving a mother who was initially emotionally engaged with her child, but who then "switched off" from emotional resonance to emotional detachment, perhaps under the influence of loss and mourning in her own family of origin.  The impact on the child, when it finds itself unable to restore a feeling contact, is the internalisation of a hard unresponsive emotional core, which fosters a destructive form of narcissism, contributes to attachment disorders, and reveals itself as a major resistance to progress in the transference.

Later, writers have argued for differentiating a range of responses within the dead mother complex, reserving the name dead mother syndrome for the most acute form.

Literary examples
The dead mother complex has been seen as underlying both Gradiva and Freud's own psychology as seen in Delusion and Dream in Jensen's Gradiva.
Sylvia Plath in her writing has been linked to the dead mother complex.

See also

References

Further reading
 G. Kohon, The Dead Mother: The Work of André Green (1999)

External links
 Dead Mother Complex

Human development
Psychoanalytic theory